Hadena albimacula, the white spot, is a species of moth of the family Noctuidae. It is found in Europe.

Technical description and variation

The wingspan is 30–38 mm. Forewing olive brown; the lines black, slightly picked out with white scales; claviform stigma of ground colour edged at end with black , followed by a quadrate white blotch ; orbicular round and white with slight grey centre ; reniform edged internally with white; both outlined with black; small white blotches beyond orbicular and between
veins 2 and 3 at base; a whitish blotch at base of costa and a white costal spot above orbicular stigma; hindwing dark fuscous; basal half greyer, with darker veins. — Larva brownish ochreous; dorsal line fine, indistinct, marked by blackish spots which connect the subdorsal oblique stripes; lateral lines pale grey; spiracles white ringed with black.

Biology
The moth flies from May to August depending on the location.

The larvae feed on Silene species.

References

External links
 White Spot at UKmoths

Hadena
Moths of Europe
Moths described in 1792